The Africa Women's Sevens is the continental championship for women's international rugby sevens in Africa. The tournament sanctioned and sponsored by Rugby Africa (previously CAR) which is the rugby union governing body for the continent.

The first official regional 7s championship for international women's teams from Africa was held in Tunisia in 2004, although this only included teams from Northern Africa. The first World Cup Sevens qualifier for women's teams from Africa was held in Uganda in 2008. Since then, African championships have periodically served as pre-qualifying competitions for the Rugby 7s World Cup, or other sevens tournaments such as at the Summer Olympics.

Background
Rugby sevens — also known as 7-a-side, or 7s — is a short form of the sport of rugby union that was first played in 1883. The first (men's) internationals took place in 1973. As women's rugby union developed in the 1960s and 1970s the format became very popular as it allowed games, and entire leagues, to be developed in countries even when player numbers were small, and it remains the main form the women's game is played in most parts of the world.

However, although the first women's international rugby union 15-a-side test match took place in 1982, it was not until 1997 before the first women's international 7s tournaments were played, when the 1997 Hong Kong Sevens included a women's tournament for the first time. Over the next decade the number of tournaments grew, with almost every region developing regular championship competitions. This reached its zenith with 2009's inaugural women's tournament for the Rugby World Cup Sevens, shortly followed by the announcement that women's rugby sevens will be included in the Olympics from 2016.

Honours
Winners of continent-wide African Championship tournaments for national women's sevens teams:*  

* Note: Does not include regional competitions for Northern or Southern Africa, or tournaments including developmental sides or non-national teams.

The following are details of all regional women's international championships played in Africa, listed chronologically with the earliest first, with all result details, where known (included are the CAR Women's Sevens and other official regional championships, e.g. CAR North and South tournaments).

2004 CAR tournaments

CAR North Tournament 2004 
Played in Tunisia.

Group stage
GROUP A

Tunisia 22-12 Béziers
Béziers 32-5 Malta
Tunisia 34-5 Malta
GROUP B

Montpellier 12-5 Portugal
Tunisia Universities 0-15 Montpellier
Tunisia Universities 10-5 Portugal

Classification stage 
Semi-finals
Tunisia 24-0 Tunisia Universities
Montpellier 7-5 Béziers
5th/6th Place
Portugal 29-0 Malta
3rd/4th Place
Tunisia Universities beat Béziers
Final
Tunisia 17-5 Montpellier

CAR South Tournament 2004 
October 2004. 
Results not available. Rwanda and Burundi sent their national teams to play against club teams from Uganda and Kenya (inc. Thunderbirds A, B and C (Uganda), Mwamba (Kenya)). Thunderbirds from Uganda won the tournament.

2005 CAR tournaments

CAR North Tournament 2005 
Played in Tunisia.  Montpellier known to have played.

CAR South Tournament 2005 
Planned for Kampala, 5–6 November.
The International Rugby Board (IRB) through the Confederation of African Rugby (CAR) offered 10,000 US dollars towards the first African women's rugby tournament to be held in Uganda. However CAR did not release the money as promised so it was called off. CAR released the money the following year (2006) for the first CAR 7s tournament where Uganda, Uganda Select, Kenya, South Africa, Rwanda, Burundi, Zambia and Zimbabwe participated

2006 CAR tournaments

CAR North Tournament 2006 
Played in Tunisia.  Montpellier known to have played.

CAR South Tournament 2006 
Played in Uganda.

CAR Tournament 2006 
Venue/Date: Kyadondo Rugby Club, Kampala, Uganda, 24 June 2006 (Source CAR and Uganda Correspondent) Summarised

Pool stages
POOL One

South Africa Emerging 26-0 Zambia
Kenya 33-0 Uganda Select
South Africa Emerging 22-5 Uganda Select
Kenya 22-0 Zambia
Zambia 21-0 Uganda Select
South Africa Emerging 14-0 Kenya
POOL Two

Uganda 24-5 Rwanda
Zimbabwe 15-0 Burundi
Uganda 56-0 Burundi
Zimbabwe 0-25 Rwanda
Rwanda 41-0 Burundi
Uganda 54-0 Zimbabwe

Classification stages 
Semi-finals Plate
Zambia 55-0 Burundi
Uganda Select 22-0 Zimbabwe
Semi-finals Cup
Emerging South Africa 48-0 Rwanda
Uganda 22-17 Kenya (sudden death aet)
Plate Final
Uganda Select 0-33 Zambia
1st/2nd Final
Uganda 7-15 Emerging South Africa

2007 CAR tournaments

CAR North Tournament 2007 
Date/Venue: Tunis, Tunisia, 9–10 March 2007 (Source Uganda Correspondent) Summarised

Matches
Tunisia 5-0 Arabian Gulf
Uganda 22-0 Ivory Coast
Tunisian Universities 5-5 Arabian Gulf
Tunisia 36-0 Ivory Coast
Uganda 5-0 Tunisian Universities
Tunisia 17-5 Tunisian Universities
Uganda 17-10 Arabian Gulf
Arabian Gulf beat Ivory Coast
Tunisian Universities beat Ivory Coast
Uganda 5-5 Tunisia

Final Placings

Champions Tunisia, Runners Up Uganda
3rd Arabian Gulf, 4th Tunisian Universities, 5th Ivory Coast

CAR Tournament 2007 
Date/Venue: Kyadondo Club, Kampala, Uganda, 16 June 2007 (Source CAR and Uganda correspondent) Summarised

Pool stages
POOL One

Emerging South Africa 14-12 Zambia
Kenya 57-0 Burundi
Emerging South Africa 28-0 Uganda Select
Kenya 17-14 Zambia
Emerging South Africa 59-0 Burundi
Zambia 7-10 Uganda Select
Kenya 12-0 Uganda Select
Zambia 57-0 Burundi
Burundi 0-27 Uganda Select
Emerging South Africa 24-12 Kenya
POOL Two

Uganda 44-0 Rwanda
Tunisia 14-10 Pretoria University
Uganda 42-0 Zimbabwe
Tunisia 47-0 Rwanda
Uganda 26-5 Pretoria University
Rwanda 5-24 Zimbabwe
Tunisia 43-0 Zimbabwe
Rwanda 0-38 Pretoria University
Pretoria University 32-0 Zimbabwe
Uganda 17-5 Tunisia

Classification stages 
Plate Semi-finals
Uganda Select 36-0 Zimbabwe
Pretoria University 5-26 Zambia
1st-4th Semi-finals
Uganda 14-0 Kenya
Emerging South Africa 34-0 Tunisia
Plate Final
Uganda Select 5-21 Zambia
1st/2nd Final
Uganda 7-20 Emerging South Africa

2008 CAR Tournament/World Cup qualifier

African Tournament 2008
Venue/Date: East London, South Africa, August 7–9, 2008.

Likely teams were South Africa, England, Canada, France, Australia, USA, New Zealand, Samoa, Wales, Uganda, Rwanda, Kenya, Morocco, Zimbabwe, Tunisia and Zambia
This was cancelled three weeks before the event but has been left in as it signposts the future.

African World Cup Qualifier 2008 (incorporating CAR South Tournament)
Venue/Date: Kampala, Uganda on September 20 to September 21, 2008 with two teams to qualify for Dubai 2009.

Invitations were forwarded to the following countries:
South AfricaKenyaUgandaCôte d'IvoireTunisiaMadagascarZimbabweBotswanaNigeriaZambia

Unions were asked to show that there are proper existing structures in place for Women’s Rugby and that they would be capable of fielding a competitive team in the tournament. In the end all but Nigeria entered (their reason for dropping out not known). Madagascar and Ivory Coast then withdrew and Uganda A came in to provide two even groups.
The schedule was 3 groups of 3, winners and best second into semi finals. This was then changed to 2 groups of 4.

Pool stages
POOL A

South Africa 43-0 Uganda A
Kenya 20-19 Zambia
South Africa 31-0 Zambia
Kenya 17-0 Uganda A
Uganda A 0-31 Zambia
South Africa 36-5 Kenya
POOL B

Uganda 30-0 Zimbabwe
Tunisia 45-0 Botswana
Uganda 46-0 Botswana
Tunisia 53-0 Zimbabwe
Zimbabwe 24-0 Botswana
Uganda 5-12 Tunisia

Classification stages
Cup Semi-finals

Winners qualify for Dubai
South Africa 26-5 Kenya
Uganda 7-0 Tunisia
Bowl Semi-finals
Uganda A 10-26 Zambia
Zimbabwe 17-0 Botswana
Shield Final
Botswana 7-20 Uganda A
Bowl Final
Zambia 38-0 Zimbabwe
Plate Final
Kenya 15-14 Tunisia
Cup Final 
South Africa 24-0 Uganda

2009 CAR tournaments

CAR North West 2009 
Venue/Date: 6–7 June 2009, Accra, Ghana. Ivory Coast were invited but did not attend.

Pool stages
Pool A
Ghana, Burkina Faso, Tunisia
Tunisia 34-0 Ghana
Tunisia bt Burkina Faso
Ghana bt Burkina Faso
Pool B
Nigeria, Egypt, Togo, Morocco
Nigeria 5-5 Morocco
Nigeria 43-5 Togo
Nigeria 66-0 Egypt

Classification stages
5th Burkina Faso, 6th Togo, 7th Egypt
Semi-finals
Nigeria 17-0 Ghana
Tunisia 47-0 Morocco
3rd Place
Ghana 5-0 Morocco
Final 
Tunisia 43-5 Nigeria

CAR Tournament 2009
Possibly 25–26 September 2009, Kampala, Uganda. Cancelled due to a lack of sponsorship

2010 CAR tournaments

CAR North West 2010
28 & 29 May 2010. Ouagadougou, Burkina Faso
Mali withdrew and were replaced by Burkina Faso
POOL A

Morocco 29-0 Togo
Morocco 28-0 Ghana
Senegal 10-7 Morocco
Senegal 5-5 Ghana
Senegal beat Togo
Ghana beat Togo

Semi-finals
Senegal 7-0 Burkina Faso
Tunisia 43-0  Morocco

Consolation semifinals
Ivory Coast beat Togo
Ghana beat Burkina Faso B

7th place final
Togo beat Burkina Faso B
POOL B

Burkina Faso A 0-41 Tunisia
Ivory Coast A 0-40 Tunisia
Burkina Faso beat Ivory Coast
Burkina Faso B 0-37 Tunisia
Burkina Faso A beat Burkina Faso B
Burkina Faso B lost to Ivory Coast

5th place final
Ivory Coast beat Ghana

3rd place final 
Morocco 12-0 Burkina Faso

Final
Tunisia 50-0 Senegal

2011 CAR tournaments

CAR North 2011
23–24 April 2011. Thies, Senegal
Tournament semi-finalists will qualify for the 2012 African Sevens Championship, which will act as a qualifier for the 2013 World Cup. Nigeria withdrew at the last minute, Niger arrived with a team composed mainly by U18 girls and were excluded.
POOL A

Tunisia 40-0 Egypt
Burkina Faso 20-5 Egypt
Tunisia 26-0 Burkina Faso

5th place
Cameroon 27-0 Egypt

Semi-finals
Senegal 24-0 Burkina Faso
Tunisia 24-0 Morocco
POOL B

Senegal 12-7 Cameroon
Morocco 12-0 Cameroon
Senegal 10-5 Morocco

3rd place
Morocco 19-5 Burkina Faso

Final
Senegal 0-5 Tunisia

CAR South 2011
29–30 October 2011. Botswana
Tournament semi-finalists will qualify for the 2012 African Sevens Championship, which will act as a qualifier for the 2013 World Cup
POOL A

South Africa 34-0 Zambia
Rwanda 0-40 Zimbabwe
South Africa 37-5 Zimbabwe
Rwanda 0-20 Zambia
Zambia 12-19 Zimbabwe
Rwanda 0-51 South Africa

Plate semi-finals
Botswana 5-19 Zambia
Madagascar 36-0 Rwanda

Plate final (5th/6th)
Madagascar 14-15 Zambia

7th/8th place
Botswana 24-0 Rwanda
POOL B

Kenya 5-17 Uganda
Botswana 0-14 Madagascar
Kenya 29-10 Madagascar
Botswana 7-17 Uganda
Madagascar 0-17 Uganda
Botswana 0-31 Kenya

Semi-finals
Kenya 5-14 South Africa
Uganda 7-0 Zimbabwe

3rd place
Kenya 17-0 Zimbabwe

Final
South Africa 42-5 Uganda

African Championship/World Cup Qualifier 2012
29–30 September 2012. Rabat, Morocco
South Africa withdrew as they automatically qualified for the World Cup. Cameroon withdrew on the morning of the tournament. Tunisia qualify for the finals in Moscow.
POOL A

Tunisia 36-0 Zambia
Kenya 34-0 Morocco
Kenya 36-0 Zambia
Tunisia 32-0 Morocco
Morocco 0-5 Zambia
Tunisia 5-7 Kenya

Plate semi-finals
Zimbabwe 5-0 Morocco
Zambia bye

Plate final (5th/6th)
Zambia 10-14 Zimbabwe

7th place
Morocco
POOL B

Senegal 7-5 Zimbabwe
Uganda 12-5 Zimbabwe
Uganda 22-0 Senegal

Semi-finals
Kenya 7-0 Senegal
Uganda 5-19 Tunisia

3rd place
Uganda 12-5 Senegal

Final
Tunisia 14-10 Kenya

African Championship 2013
20–21 April 2013. Tunis, Tunisia
POOL A

South Africa 27-0 Senegal
Kenya 29-7 Senegal
South Africa 36-0 Kenya

Plate final (5th/6th)
Zimbabwe 19-0 Senegal
POOL B

Tunisia 17-0 Zimbabwe
Uganda 24-0 Zimbabwe
Tunisia 12-5 Uganda

Semi-finals
South Africa 17-0 Uganda
Tunisia 15-7 Kenya

3rd place
Uganda 12-0 Kenya

Final
Tunisia 5-29 South Africa

African Championship 2014
12 April 2014. Machakos, Kenya
POOL A

Senegal 14-19 Madagascar 
Kenya 24-14 Madagascar 
South Africa 19-0 Senegal 
Kenya 22-0 Senegal 
South Africa 19-12 Madagascar 
South Africa 21-12 Kenya

Bowl Semi-finals
Namibia 0-40 Madagascar
Uganda 24-10 Senegal

Bowl final (5th/6th)
Madagascar 5-10 Uganda

Shield final (7th/8th)
Namibia 0-33 Senegal
POOL B

Zimbabwe 33-0 Namibia 
Uganda 45-0 Namibia 
Tunisia 21-0 Zimbabwe
Uganda 5-10 Zimbabwe
Tunisia 29-0 Namibia
Tunisia 14-7 Uganda

Semi-finals
Tunisia 10-14 Kenya
South Africa 43-0 Zimbabwe

Plate final (3rd/4th)
Tunisia 31-0 Zimbabwe

Final
Kenya 0-15 South Africa

See also
 Africa Men's Sevens

Notes

 
Rugby sevens competitions in Africa
2004 establishments in Africa
Women's rugby union competitions in Africa for national teams
Recurring sporting events established in 2007